Eurynogaster is a genus of flies in the family Dolichopodidae, endemic to Hawaii. It is part of the Eurynogaster complex of genera.

Species

 Eurynogaster ablusispina Tenorio, 1969
 Eurynogaster angusticerca Tenorio, 1969
 Eurynogaster angustifacies Hardy & Kohn, 1964
 Eurynogaster argentata Hardy & Kohn, 1964
 Eurynogaster callaina Hardy & Kohn, 1964
 Eurynogaster cilifemorata Parent, 1939
 Eurynogaster clavaticauda Van Duzee, 1933
 Eurynogaster concava Tenorio, 1969
 Eurynogaster furva Hardy & Kohn, 1964
 Eurynogaster hawaiiensis (Grimshaw, 1901)
 Eurynogaster incompta Hardy & Kohn, 1964
 Eurynogaster kauaiensis Hardy & Kohn, 1964
 Eurynogaster maculata Parent, 1939
 Eurynogaster mediocris Tenorio, 1969
 Eurynogaster obscura Tenorio, 1969
 Eurynogaster paludis Hardy & Kohn, 1964
 Eurynogaster pulverea Hardy & Kohn, 1964
 Eurynogaster retrociliata Parent, 1939
 Eurynogaster spinigera (Grimshaw, 1901)
 Eurynogaster subciliata Hardy & Kohn, 1964
 Eurynogaster tanyceraea Hardy & Kohn, 1964
 Eurynogaster undulata Tenorio, 1969
 Eurynogaster variabilis Hardy & Kohn, 1964
 Eurynogaster vittata Hardy & Kohn, 1964

References 

Hydrophorinae
Dolichopodidae genera
Insects of Hawaii
Endemic fauna of Hawaii